Chef's Story is a 26-Part Public Television series featuring Dorothy Cann Hamilton interviewing well known chefs and restaurateurs. Hamilton, founder and CEO of The French Culinary Institute, conducts the interviews in front of culinary students in the first half of each episode.
Each chef then moves into a kitchen in the second half and prepares a dish that they consider signature or instructive. The FCI's International Culinary Theater acts as the host for each episode.

Inspired by Inside the Actors Studio, interviews focus on each guest's growth as a chef and the philosophy they bring to their restaurants.

Chef's Story is produced by Soho Culinary Productions, Full Plate Media, and Lemnos Development and debuted on public television stations in April 2007.
A companion book compiled by Dorothy Hamilton and Patric Kuh was also published by HarperCollins.

List of episodes
 Rick Bayless
 Anthony Bourdain
 Lidia Bastianich
 André Soltner
 Bobby Flay
 Daniel Boulud
 Jacques Pépin
 Thomas Keller
 Cat Cora
 Patrick O'Connell
 Michel Richard
 Alain Sailhac
 Marcus Samuelsson
 José Andrés
 Todd English
 Norman Van Aken
 Suzanne Goin
 Dean Fearing/Robert Del Grande
 Dan Barber
 Jacques Torres
 Jean-Georges Vongerichten
 Charlie Palmer
 Charlie Trotter
 David Bouley
 Arun Sampanthavivat
 Tom Colicchio

References

PBS original programming
2000s American cooking television series